The Albert Gallatin Memorial Bridge (also known as the Point Marion Bridge) was a cantilever truss bridge that carried vehicular traffic across the Monongahela River in the southwestern part of the U.S. state of Pennsylvania.  Built in 1930 to replace a ferry, it connected Point Marion in Fayette County and Dunkard Township in Greene County.  It was named in honor of U.S. Senator, and longtime U.S. Treasury Secretary and diplomat Albert Gallatin, whose Friendship Hill homestead is nearby.

History
The original bridge was constructed in 1930 by the Point Marion Bridge Company and rehabilitated in 1976.

It was a historically significant bridge due to the relatively unusual cantilever truss design and was listed on the National Register of Historic Places as the second oldest bridge of this type in the state.

It was replaced by the new Point Marion Bridge in October 2009. The old bridge was imploded on November 16, 2009.

Photo gallery

See also
List of crossings of the Monongahela River

References

External links
[ National Register nomination form]

Bridges completed in 1930
Bridges over the Monongahela River
Road bridges on the National Register of Historic Places in Pennsylvania
Bridges in Fayette County, Pennsylvania
Bridges in Greene County, Pennsylvania
National Register of Historic Places in Greene County, Pennsylvania
Steel bridges in the United States
Cantilever bridges in the United States
Parker truss bridges in the United States